Iraq and Saudi Arabia are two fierce rivals of the Arab world. Their matches are often considered to be one of the most heated rivalries in the world.

Although received lesser attention comparing to rivalry with Iran of both sides, it is one of the oldest rivalries in Asia. Emotions often run high when two teams meet each others.

Reason behind the rivalry
The main reasons for this rivalry are political differences, and historical grievances. During the Gulf War in the 1990s, Iraq invaded Kuwait, an ally of Saudi Arabia, and both fought a short but bloody war that would continue to have a major impact on their relations. Due to the Gulf War of 1991, Saudi Arabia and Iraq had no official diplomatic relations, resulting in the 2002 FIFA World Cup qualification matches between the two nations being held on neutral grounds of Bahrain and Jordan.

Recently, accusations from Iraq that Saudi Arabia is instigating terrorist groups, like ISIS and Al-Qaeda, further deepened enmity between the two nations.

Major tournament matches
1976 AFC Asian Cup qualification

1976 AFC Asian Cup qualification

1982 FIFA World Cup qualification

1994 FIFA World Cup qualification

1996 AFC Asian Cup

2002 FIFA World Cup qualification

2002 FIFA World Cup qualification

2004 AFC Asian Cup

2007 AFC Asian Cup

2015 AFC Asian Cup qualification

2015 AFC Asian Cup qualification

2018 FIFA World Cup qualification

2018 FIFA World Cup qualification

Matches
Source:

Statistics

See also
Iran–Iraq football rivalry
Iran–Saudi Arabia football rivalry

References

International association football rivalries
Saudi Arabia national football team
Iraq national football team
Iraq–Saudi Arabia relations
1976 establishments in Asia
Politics and sports